Short circuit ratio or SCR is a measure of the stability of an electromechanical generator. It is the ratio of field current required to produce rated  armature voltage at open circuit to the field current required to produce the rated armature current at short circuit.

The SCR can be calculated for each point on a grid. Where the SCR is above 1, a grid has good grid strength; it will be less affected by the variations in frequency and can provide more short circuit current.

Generator SCR 
The larger the SCR, the smaller is alternator reactance (Xd) and inductance Ld. This is result of larger air gaps in generator design (As in Hydro generators or Salient Pole Machines). It results in to Machine loosely coupled to grid and its response will be slow. This increases the machines’ stability while operating on grid, but simultaneously will increase the short circuit current delivery capability of the machine (higher short circuit current) and subsequently higher machine size and its cost. Typical values of SCR for Hydro alternators may be in the range of 1 to 1.5.

Conversely, smaller the SCR, then larger is alternators reactance (Xd), the larger is Ld. It is a result of small air gaps in machine design (As in Turbo generators or Cylindrical rotor Machines). Machines are tightly coupled to grid and their response will be fast. This reduces the machine’s stability while operating on grid and will reduce the short circuit current delivery capability (lower short circuit current), smaller machine size, and lower cost subsequently. Typical values of SCR for turbo alternators may be in the range of 0.45 to 0.9.

Impact on grid 

The SCR can be calculated for each point on an electrical grid. A point on a grid having number of machines with an SCR above a number between 1 and 1.5 has less vulnerability to voltage instability. Hence, such grid is known strong grid or power system. A power system (grid) having lower SCR has more vulnerability to grid voltage instability. Hence such a grid or system is known as a weak grid or a weak power system.

Grid strength can be increased by installing synchronous condensers.

See also
Transformer
Alternator
Synchronous motor

References

Electromechanical engineering